The Quiet Zone/The Pleasure Dome is the eighth album by British progressive rock band Van der Graaf Generator. Released in 1977, it was their last studio album before their 2005 reunion. The album features a more energetic, new wave sound than its three immediate predecessors, anticipating singer and songwriter Peter Hammill's late 1970s solo work.

For this album, bassist Nic Potter returned to the band, having left in 1970, and violinist Graham Smith (String Driven Thing) also joined the line-up, in place of the two members who had departed in the aftermath of their previous album, World Record (October 1976): organist Hugh Banton and saxophonist/flutist David Jackson. This considerably modified the band's sound. Officially, the band's name was shortened to just "Van der Graaf" for this album and the live album, Vital (July 1978), that followed, but contemporaneous Charisma Records promotional materials used both the full and shortened name.

Reception 

Critical reception was positive. Melody Maker said the band "[had] just come up with an album that finally approached the band's long-promised potential".

Track listing 
All songs written by Peter Hammill, except where noted.

Tracks on 2005 reissue
 "Door" – 3:23
 Non-album studio version
 "The Wave" – 3:03
 Instrumental demo version
 "Ship of Fools" – 3:43
 B-side of "Cat's Eye" single (only released in France)

Reissue packaging issues 
The 2005 reissue added some B-sides and a demo. The last two of these, "The Wave" and "Ship of Fools", were labelled the wrong way around on the CD packaging.

Personnel 
Van der Graaf  
 Peter Hammill – vocals, electric and acoustic guitars, piano
 Graham Smith – violin
 Nic Potter – bass guitar
 Guy Evans – drums, percussion

 as a guest musician  
 David Jackson – saxophone

References

External links 
 The Quiet Zone / The Pleasure Dome at vandergraafgenerator.co.uk
 Van der Graaf - The Quiet Zone/The Pleasure Dome (1977) album review by Steven McDonald, credits & releases at AllMusic.com
 Van der Graaf - The Quiet Zone/The Pleasure Dome (1977) album releases & credits at Discogs.com
 Van der Graaf - The Quiet Zone/The Pleasure Dome (1977) album credits & user reviews at ProgArchives.com
 Van der Graaf - The Quiet Zone/The Pleasure Dome (1977) album to be listened as stream at Spotify.com

Van der Graaf Generator albums
1977 albums
Charisma Records albums
Albums recorded at Rockfield Studios
Albums recorded at Morgan Sound Studios